Murong (LHC: *mɑC-joŋ; EMC: *mɔh-juawŋ)  or Muren refers to an ethnic Xianbei tribe who are attested from the time of Tanshihuai (reigned 156–181). Different strands of evidence exist linking the Murong to the Mongols nomadic confederation in Central Asia. The Former Yan (337–370), Western Yan (384–394), Later Yan (384–409) dynasties as well as Tuyuhun (285–670) were all founded by the Murong peoples.

Murong is also a surname, predominantly used by peoples of Xianbei descent. Prominent individuals who bear the surname include the Emperors and family of Former Yan and Later Yan, Murong Ke (慕容恪), Murong Long (慕容隆), Murong Sanzang (慕容三藏), Murong Yanzhao (慕容延钊), Murong Yanchao (慕容彦超), Murong Nong (慕容农), Murong Han (慕容翰), Murong Chuqiang (慕容楚强), Murong Haoran (慕容浩然), and the fictional character Murong Fu (慕容復). When Han peoples during the reign of Yuwen Tai were forced to change their surnames, Murong was one of three officially mandated Xianbei surnames. This policy was reversed by Emperor Wen of Sui, but some Han peoples retained the Murong surname.

Origins 

The chieftain Murong was the first ancestor of the Murong tribe, which was named after him. He was a daren (chieftain noble) of the Middle Section during the rule of Tanshihuai (reigned 156–181). The Records of the Three Kingdoms records:

The Xianbei state of Tanshihuai to which the Murong belonged fragmented following the fall of Budugen (187–234), who was the younger brother of Kuitoi (reigned 185–187). Kuitou was the nephew of Tanshihuai's incapable son and successor Helian (reigned 181–185). The Murong consequently broke off and submitted to the Cao Wei dynasty, settling in the Liaoxi area. The Murong ruler at this time was Murong Mohuba (莫护跋), a descendant of the chieftain Murong. Murong Mohuba actively supported Sima Yi's Liaodong campaign in 238, leading an auxiliary Murong force. Mohuba was succeeded in 246 by his son Muyan (木延) who also aided the Cao Wei campaign against the Goguryeo that same year.

Muyan's son Shegui (涉歸), however, fought against the Jin dynasty (266–420), and was pushed back to the upper Liao River region. Shegui died in 283, and his younger brother Shan (刪) usurped the leadership. Murong Shan was killed in 285, and the people proclaimed Shegui's son Murong Hui (廆 b. 268, r. 285–333) as their chieftain. Hui attacked the Buyeo kingdom in the very year he became the chieftain of the Murong tribe, capturing ten thousand prisoners. He launched an attack on the agricultural area of the Liao River basin in 286 that had been occupied by Han Chinese settlers after Emperor Wu of Han's conquest of Gojoseon in 108 BCE.

Hui founded a new capital nearby the modern-day city of Chaoyang, Liaoning in 294. In 284, an internal feud developed between Murong Hui and his older brother, Tuyuhun, which folktales explained as being caused by a horse race but which was in fact caused by disputes over the position of Khan. As a result of the dispute, Murong Tuyuhun led his people and undertook a long westward journey passing through the Ordos Loop all the way to Qinghai Lake.

Some Murong members live in a town in Guangdong. Zhaoqing is the area where they lived since they moved from north to south. They practice no aspect of Xianbei culture or identity. The move to southern China from the north is described in their genealogical records. They are descended from Murong Bao. They moved to southern China after the foundation of the Ming dynasty.

Language 
The Xianbei are generally considered speakers of Mongolic languages. Some tribes such as the Duan, Qifu and Tufa have not left sufficient evidence to prove that they, as sub-tribes, were in fact Mongolic, although most scholars assume that they were Mongolic based on some indications. There is no doubt, however, regarding the Khitan and Shiwei sub-tribes being Mongolic (in their case there is strong evidence). As far as the Murong are concerned, the evidence pointing in the Mongolic direction is relatively convincing. Shimunek (2017) identifies the language of the Murong as Tuyuhun, or at least a linguistic variety closely related to it.

The Dunhuang Documents, P. 1283 (in Tibetan) records a very important piece of information about the Khitan and Murong:

The Khitan language is widely recognized as Mongolic. Mongolic, Turkic and Tungusic are mutually unintelligible, although they share significant loan-vocabulary.

The title Khagan was first seen in a speech between 283 and 289, when the Xianbei chief Murong Tuyuhun (son of Murong Shegui by an illegitimate wife) tried to escape from his younger stepbrother Murong Hui, and began his route from Liaodong to the areas of Ordos Desert. Some suggest that the titles Khan and Khagan were originally Mongolic.

The Song of the Xianbei Brother is a popular song of the Xianbei people composed by Murong Hui in 285 AD. It is preserved in Chinese translation and is about the Xianbei chief's regrets for having sent his brother Tuyuhun away to the West. The original Chinese translation left the Xianbei word for elder brother (A-kan) in the title, which is identical to the Mongolic word for elder brother (Aqan or Aghan). The same word exists in Turkic and Tungusic languages, but the Xianbei are generally considered Mongolic peoples. This would make the song one of the earliest attestations of a Mongolic language.

The modern day minority of White Mongols or Monguor are regarded as the culturally and ethnically-distinct descendants of the Murong.

Genetics
A genetic study published in the American Journal of Physical Anthropology in November 2007 examined of 17 individuals buried at the Murong Xianbei cemetery in Lamadong, Liaoning, China ca. 300 AD. They were determined to be carriers of the maternal haplogroups B, C, D, F, G2a, Z, M, and J1b1. These haplogroups are common among East Asians, and to a lesser extent Siberians. The maternal haplogroups of the Murong Xianbei were noticeably different from those of the Huns and Tuoba Xianbei.

Rulers
Murong Mohuba (238)
Murong Muyan (246)
Murong Shegui (died 283)
Murong Shan (died 285)
Murong Hui (285–333)

People

 Murong Bao (355–398), formally Emperor Huimin of (Later) Yan
 Murong Chao (385–410), last emperor of the Chinese/Xianbei state Southern Yan
 Murong Chong (d. 386), formally Emperor Wei of (Western) Yan
 Murong Chui (326–396), formally Emperor Wucheng of (Later) Yan
 Murong De (336–405), formally Emperor Xianwu of (Southern) Yan
 Murong Fuyun (597–635), ruler of the Xianbei/Qiang/Tibetan state Tuyuhun
 Murong Huang (297–348), formally Prince Wenming of (Former) Yan
 Murong Hong (d. 384), founder of the Chinese/Xianbei state Western Yan
 Murong Hui (269–333), Xianbei chief and Duke Xiang of Liaodong, posthumously honored as Prince Wuxuan of Yan
 Murong Jun (319–360), formally Emperor Jingzhao of (Former) Yan
 Murong Ke (d. 367), formally Prince Huan of Taiyuan
 Murong Lin (d. 398), general and imperial prince of the Chinese/Xianbei state Later Yan
 Murong Long (d. 397), formally Prince Kang of Gaoyang
 Murong Nong  (d. 398), formally Prince Huanlie of Liaoxi
 Murong Nuohebo (d. 688), last khan of the Xianbei/Qiang/Tibetan state Tuyuhun
 Murong Sheng  (373–401), an emperor of the Chinese/Xianbei state Later Yan
 Murong Ping (?–?), regent of the Chinese/Xianbei state Former Yan during the reign of Murong Wei (Emperor You)
 Murong Shun (d. 635), khan of the Xianbei/Qiang/Tibetan state Tuyuhun
 Murong Wei (350–385), formally Emperor You of (Former) Yan
 Murong Xi (385–407),  emperor of the Chinese/Xianbei state Later Yan
 Murong Yao (d. 386) was an emperor of the Chinese/Xianbei state Western Yan
 Murong Yi (d. 386) was a ruler of the Chinese/Xianbei state Western Yan
 Murong Yong (d. 394), last emperor of the Chinese/Xianbei state Western Yan
 Murong Zhong (d. 386) emperor of the Chinese/Xianbei state Western Yan
 Princess Murong, princess of Northern Yan, wife of Feng Hong

References

Sources

 

1st millennium in China
History of Mongolia
Sixteen Kingdoms
Xianbei
Individual Chinese surnames

zh:慕容部